The western hognose snake (Heterodon nasicus) is a species of snake in the family Colubridae. The species is endemic to North America.

Etymology
The specific name, nasicus, is from the Latin nasus ("nose"), in reference to the upturned snout.

The subspecific name, gloydi, is in honor of American herpetologist Howard K. Gloyd (1902–1978).

The subspecific (or specific) name, kennerlyi, is in honor of American naturalist Caleb Burwell Rowan Kennerly.

Common names
Common names for Heterodon nasicus include blow snake, bluffer, faux viper, plains hognose snake, prairie hognose snake, spoonbill snake, spreadhead snake, Texas hognose snake, Texas rooter, and western hognose snake.

Taxonomy
Some authors elevate H. n. kennerlyi, also known as the Mexican hognose snake, to species level. Those same authors have subsumed H. n. gloydi into H. nasicus so that there are only two species (H. nasicus and H. kennerlyi) and no subspecies.

Description
The western hognose snake is a relatively small, stout-bodied snake. Its color and pattern is highly variable between subspecies, although most specimens appear much like rattlesnakes to the untrained eye, which appears to be Batesian mimicry. This snake gets its common name, "hognose", from the modified rostral (nose) scale that is formed in an upturned manner, providing a very "hog-like" look. Additionally, this adaptation makes these snakes adept burrowers.

The species is not dangerous to humans, but there exists scientific debate regarding whether the mild toxins in the hognose's bite result from saliva, harmful to its preferred wild food source – toads – or an extremely mild venom produced in glands connecting to the hognose's minuscule rear fangs. In either case, no deaths or systemic effects from the extremely rare bite from this rear-fanged snake have been recorded. Although bites may uncommonly be medically significant, the species is not regarded as venomous.

In captivity, the species has been bred into about 52 different "designer" color morphs.

Distribution and habitat
The western hognose snake occurs from southern Canada throughout the United States to northern Mexico. It frequents areas with sandy or gravelly soils, including prairies, river floodplains, scrub and grasslands, semi-deserts, and some semiagricultural areas.

Ecology

Behavior
The western hognose snake is primarily diurnal. It is typically a docile snake (though known to be highly defensive in some individuals). If threatened (or perceiving a threat), it may flatten its neck (much like a cobra), hiss, and make 'mock' or 'bluff' strikes if harassed, which are strikes made at an intruder but with the snakes' mouth closed. Subsequently, even when further harassed, western hognose snakes virtually never bite as a self defense mechanism, but will instead usually resort to playing dead.
Although it is more common that it will flatten its head, some individuals may puff up, filling the throat with air. This is more common with adolescent males.

Diet
In the wild, the western hognose snake feeds predominately on amphibians, such as large and medium-sized tree frogs, as well as small or medium-sized toads and small lizards. There have been accounts of  H. nasicus eating the occasional rodent in the wild as well. Not being a true constrictor, Heterodon bites and chews, driving the rear fangs into the prey as a way of introducing the saliva to help break down the toxins from toads. There have been many cases of hognose snakes in captivity that will not eat for about two to three-and-a-half months, from the months January to mid March. This is because hognose snakes' instinct is to brumate underground during the winter months.

Reproduction
Adult western hognose snakes have been observed in copulation as early as February and March. The species is oviparous, with females laying 4–23 elongate, thin-shelled eggs in June–August. The eggs take approximately 60 days to hatch.

Subspecies

Conservation
Although some local declines have been reported, the species H. nasicus is widespread, has a large overall population size (> 100,000), and is effectively protected by a variety of conservation programs. It is therefore currently classified as Least Concern by the IUCN. The eastern hognose snake (Heterodon platirhinos) is classified as a threatened species in some regions of its range and is therefore protected under those states' laws.

References

External links

Heterodon nasicus at Animal Diversity Web. Accessed 14 September 2007.
Heterodon nasicus, The Illinois Natural History Survey.
Western Hognose Snake, Reptiles and Amphibians of Iowa.

Further reading
Baird SF, Girard C (1852). "Characteristics of some New Reptiles in the Museum of the Smithsonian Institution". Proc. Acad. Nat. Sci. Philadelphia 6: 68–70. (Heterodon nasicum [sic], new species, p. 70).
Baird SF, Girard C (1852). In: Stansbury H (1852). Exploration and Survey of the Valley of the Great Salt Lake of Utah, Including Reconnoissance [sic] of a New Route through the Rocky Mountains. Philadelphia: Senate of The United States. (Lippincott, Grambo & Co., printers). 487 pp. (Hetorodon [sic] nasicus, pp. 352–353).
Boulenger GA (1894). Catalogue of the Snakes in the British Museum (Natural History). Volume II., Containing the Conclusion of the Colubridæ Aglyphæ. London: Trustees of the British Museum (Natural History). (Taylor and Francis, printers). xi + 382 pp. + Plates I–XX. (Heterodon nasicus, pp. 156–157).
Conant, Roger; Bridges, William (1939). What Snake Is That? A Field Guide to the Snakes of the United States East of the Rocky Mountains. (with 108 drawings by Edmond Malnate.) New York and London: D. Appleton-Century Company. Frontispiece map + viii + 163 pp. + Plates A–C, 1–32. (Heterodon nasicus, pp. 40–41 + Plate 4, Figure 12).
Edgren, Richard A. (1952). "A Synopsis of the Snakes of the Genus Heterodon, with the Diagnosis of a New Race of Heterodon nasicus Baird and Girard". Nat. Hist. Misc., Chicago Acad. Sci. 112: 1–4. (Heterodon nasicus gloydi, new subspecies).
Kennicott R (1860). "Descriptions of New Species of North American Serpents in the Museum of the Smithsonian Institution, Washington". Proc. Acad Nat. Sci. Philadelphia 12: 328–338. (Heterodon kennerlyi, new species, pp. 336–337).
Powell R, Conant R, Collins JT (2016). Peterson Field Guide to Reptiles and Amphibians of Eastern and Central North America, Fourth Edition. Boston and New York: Houghton Mifflin Harcourt. xiv + 494 pp., 47 plates, 207 figures. . (Heterodon nasicus, pp. 407–408, Figure 189 + Plate 39).
Schmidt, Karl P.; Davis, D. Dwight (1941). Field Book of Snakes of the United States and Canada. New York: G.P. Putnam's Sons. 365 pp., 34 plates, 103 figures. (Heterodon nasicus, pp. 115–118, Figures 25–26 + Plate 11).
Smith, Hobart M.; Brodie, Edmund D. Jr. (1982). Reptiles of North America: A Guide to Field Identification. New York: Golden Press. 240 pp.  (paperback),  (hardcover). (Heterodon nasicus, pp. 164–167).
Stebbins RC (2003). A Field Guide to Western Reptiles and Amphibians, Third Edition. The Peterson Field Guide Series ®. Boston and New York: Houghton Mifflin. xiii + 533 pp.  (paperback). (Heterodon nasicus, pp. 347–348 + Plate 47 + Map 129).

Heterodon
Snakes of North America
Reptiles of the United States
Reptiles of Canada
Reptiles of Mexico
Taxa named by Spencer Fullerton Baird
Taxa named by Charles Frédéric Girard
Reptiles described in 1852